Voglje is a village in the Municipality of Šenčur in the Upper Carniola region of Slovenia.

Name
Voglje was attested in written sources in 1247 as in villa Winkeler (and as Winchleren in 1313 and Winklern in 1408). The Slovene name developed from the plural accusative demonym *Ǫgъľane, derived from the common noun *ǫgъlъ (> Sln. vogel) 'corner; upper part of a mountain chain; place where two ridges diverge', and therefore originally refers to the residents of such a location.

Church
The local church is dedicated to Saint Simon and Saint Jude and was built in 1750 on the site of an earlier church.

References

External links

Voglje at Geopedia

Populated places in the Municipality of Šenčur